Brandon Lee Brown (born September 14, 1993) is an American professional stock car racing driver. He last competed full-time in the NASCAR Xfinity Series, driving  for several teams including the No. 68 Chevrolet Camaro for Brandonbilt Motorsports.

Brown inadvertently became associated with politics after winning the 2021 Sparks 300, when NBC Sports reporter Kelli Stavast's misstating of a crowd chant led to "Let's Go Brandon" becoming a political slogan used against U.S. President Joe Biden.

Racing career

Early career
Brown first started racing when he was ten, driving go-karts at King George Speedway before moving to dirt track racing, winning the 2006 World Karting Association Mid-South Region Jr. championship. Two years later, he won the Jr. Restricted Light and Heavy Division championships, followed by the VDKA Series and Jr. Restricted Light and Heavy Division championships in 2009. In 2010, Brown began competing in the Whelen All-American Series with family-owned Brandonbilt Motorsports, winning a race and eventually the Virginia Rookie of the Year Award. The next year, he won three races at Old Dominion Speedway.

NASCAR

In 2014, Brown made his Camping World Truck Series debut at Iowa Speedway, finishing 25th after starting 27th. He made two more starts in the year, with a best finish of 19th at New Hampshire Motor Speedway.

The following year, he attempted eight races but failed to qualify for three. After starting the season with a 29th-place finish at Atlanta Motor Speedway, he ended the year with a best finish of 14th at Dover International Speedway.

In the 2016 season opener at Daytona International Speedway, Brown finished a career-best fourth place. Brown made his Xfinity Series debut at his home track of Richmond International Raceway in September 2016. Brown increased his Xfinity Series schedule in 2017, with intentions of running ten races in addition to select Truck races.

After driving a full-time Xfinity Series schedule in 2019 for 2 teams, Brown drove the No. 68 Chevrolet for Brandonbilt Motorsports the following year. He made his first appearance in the NASCAR Xfinity Series playoffs, finishing 12th in the regular-season standings, but was eliminated following the first round.

In 2021, Brown tied his best career finish with a sixth at Daytona, followed by an eighth-place finish at the Daytona Road Course. He improved on his best finish at Phoenix when he finished third after various leaders were forced into the wall on an overtime restart. 

At the Sparks 300 at Talladega in October 2021, Brown was in contention throughout the latter part of the race after escaping the first big wreck that took place on lap 88. As the race started late in the day because of the Truck race that was completed just earlier, there was a chance that the race would be called early if another caution had come out as it was starting to get dark. With a push from behind, Brown, who was not in the playoffs, was able to narrowly get ahead of Brandon Jones and Justin Allgaier in time when the final caution of the race came out with 13 to go due to another big crash. The race was ultimately called with five laps to go due to darkness, and Brown would score his first career Xfinity Series win in his 114th start.

Sponsorships
Coastal Carolina University, Brown’s alma mater, served as a primary sponsor on Brown's truck and Xfinity car during the early part of his career. 

When his team was struggling to find sponsorship during the 2021 season, Brown made a Twitter video in June 2021, dressing up as a 'used car salesman' in an attempt to promote his team and find available sponsors for upcoming races. The video paid off as Brandonbilt Motorsports announced they had secured enough sponsorship, including one from American PetroLog, a provider of logistics services for the petrochemical industry, as well as cryptocurrency company TradeTheChain.com, to finish off the rest of the season.

"Let's Go Brandon"

After his first win at Talladega, Brown was being interviewed at the start-finish line by NBC Sports reporter Kelli Stavast, when many in the crowd began to chant "Fuck Joe Biden." Stavast, who did not mishear the chant, stated, "You can hear the chants from the crowd, 'Let's go, Brandon! 

This gave rise to the political slogan "Let's Go Brandon" as a euphemism against Biden. Brown initially responded to the new political slogan with the lighthearted tweet, "To all the other Brandons out there, You're welcome! Let's go us". However, he was privately ambivalent about the phrase, because it overshadowed his Talladega win and threatened to scare off corporate sponsors, who were leery of controversy. His plan originally was to simply ignore the phrase, but as several months passed and it remained in widespread use, he worried that his silence was perceived as a tacit endorsement of the sentiment. Later that month, the Associated Press reported that Brown's Brandonbilt Motorsports team, which is family owned, was struggling to acquire sponsorship as companies were hesitant to support him due to his indirect association with the chant and its political undertones. 

In December 2021, he broke his silence on the matter in an interview with The New York Times in which he stated that, though he was a Republican, he wanted "to appeal to everybody" and had "zero desire to be involved in politics". Brown expressed his wishes for the slogan to instead be used in a positive context. He also published an op-ed in Newsweek, in which he took a more mixed stance, stating that he was "not going to endorse anyone", but that he was "not going to hesitate to speak about issues I am passionate about, or the problems we face together as Americans".

For the 2022 Henry 180 at Road America, Brown's No. 68 car promoted the children's book Brandon Spots His Sign by Sheletta Brundidge. The book follows her son Brandon, who has autism, and his interpretation of the phrase as a motivational message for him to try new activities. The Brundidges attended the race as special guests of the team and gave out copies of the book at the track. Brown described the partnership as a "breakthrough moment for us" that proved "this can be positive. This can be good. It doesn't have to be hateful or divisive."

LGBCoin sponsorship
On December 30, 2021, Brown announced that meme coin Let's Go Brandon Coin (LGBCoin) would become his primary sponsor for the full 2022 season. However, the sponsorship was rejected by NASCAR, who added that it had not been approved at the time of Brown's announcement. Brandonbilt Motorsports and LGBCoin's investors disputed NASCAR's statement, citing communications between the team and NASCAR officials, while LGBCoin manager James Koutoulas threatened legal action. Brown eventually signed a two-year personal endorsement deal with LGBCoin.

A January 2022 Change.org petition by LGBCoin claimed Brown's existing sponsors withdrew their funding as the chant grew in popularity before deleting the allegation. 2021 associate sponsors The Mohawk Foundation and Shenandoah Shine answered in the contrary, with the former's founder Ryne Hoover noting a lack of response from Brown following his Talladega win while the latter's Garrett Delph said sponsors had been "forced out" by LGBCoin. Nevertheless, they expressed willingness to resume their support should they reconcile with Brown. Original Larry's Hard Lemonade Brewing Company, who was the team's primary sponsor at Talladega, severed ties as Larry's owner Vic Reynolds voiced his frustration with Brown focusing on a dubious sponsor over committing to those already backing him; Reynolds later clarified he and Brown were still close friends but felt "betrayed" by Brown's actions. On January 13, Brown posted a Twitter statement explaining Brandonbilt had yet to renew sponsorship deals for 2022 during the offseason and that LGBCoin presented a "dream come true offer." He also apologized to his previous sponsors for his silence and maintained his goal to change "Let's Go Brandon" into a positive phrase.

Prior to the 2022 Xfinity season, Brandonbilt Motorsports hired a sales staff to search for sponsorship. Ahead of the first race at Daytona, where merchandise with the phrase was prominently displayed by fans, Brown remarked to the AP that he hoped "they know it's for me and they're pulling for me. [...] Let's go Brandon to get to Victory Lane." In February 2022, the U.S. 11th Circuit Court of Appeals ruled in a lawsuit against Bitconnect that the Securities Act of 1933 extends to targeted solicitation using social media. In April 2022, a class-action lawsuit was filed in Florida against the LGBcoin cryptocurrency company, Brown, NASCAR, and political commentator Candace Owens alleging that the defendants made false or misleading statements about the LGBcoin and that the founders of the company had engaged in a pump and dump scheme.

Personal life
Brown graduated from Coastal Carolina University in 2018 with a degree in communication; he was also a member of the Sigma Phi Epsilon fraternity. The school serves as a primary sponsor on Brown's truck and Xfinity car.

His father and team owner, Jerry Brown, underwent "aggressive" treatment for cancer after being diagnosed during a routine check-up on April 7, 2020. He revealed that his father was cancer-free on August 26 after a five month battle.

Motorsports career results

NASCAR
(key) (Bold – Pole position awarded by qualifying time. Italics – Pole position earned by points standings or practice time. * – Most laps led.)

Xfinity Series

Camping World Truck Series

 Season still in progress
 Ineligible for series points

References

External links
 
 

1993 births
Living people
Coastal Carolina University alumni
NASCAR drivers
People from Woodbridge, Virginia
Racing drivers from Virginia
Virginia Republicans